Udvar is a village in Baranya county, Hungary. This village is found near the Danube River.
Until the end of World War II, the inhabitants were Danube Swabians, also called locally as Stifolder, because their ancestors once came around 1720 from Fulda (district). Most of the former German settlers were expelled to allied-occupied Germany and allied-occupied Austria in 1945–1948, about the Potsdam Agreement.
Only a few Germans of Hungary live there, the majority today are the descendants of Hungarians from the Czechoslovak–Hungarian population exchange. They occupied the houses of the former Danube Swabians inhabitants.

References

External links 
 Street map 

Populated places in Baranya County
Croatia–Hungary border crossings